Gadi Fraiman is an Israeli sculptor and painter. He is best known for his work with painted bronze sculptures, which incorporate movement and interact with the environment. He owns the studio Gadi Fraiman Sculpture Garden - Art gallery in Mishmar David, Israel, where he displays his work.

Early life and career
Fraiman was born in Poland to parents Itzhak, a holocaust survivor and Anna. He moved to Israel at age 8 with his family in 1966. In Kibbutz Mishmar David, he began working as a farmer during his early 20's.

Fraiman started carving stones in his free time using tools he found in a warehouse on the Kibbutz in 1982. He decided to build a larger studio in 1995, located on the top of a hill in the outskirts of the Kibbutz. He restored the building and displayed his work in the gallery he opened up there. In 2002, he established a school for sculpting in bronze and stone in his studio. He continues to create art in his studio in Mishmar David.

Works
Fraiman's work is exhibited in several galleries. Apart from his bronze and colored artworks, Fraiman has series such as the Butterflies Series that include the pieces Momentum, Magic, The Butterfly Effect and Courtship. The butterflies in stone and bronze refer to the symbol of freedom. The Dance Series includes Ballet, Colored Dance, Dancer and Tango. His interest in movement resulted in his Dancing Sculptures, in which two dancers that create a new form together. The Mask Series in which two flowing, interconnected figures join to dance, include Games of Masks, Pretenders, Observers and Chess. In his Relationship Series sculptures, he reflects on the nature of human relationships. These include Relationship, Shadows, Evolution, Lovers, Dating Battle and Bonded, while the Bird Series includes Swan, Flamingo, Bird of Paradise and Black Swan.

Fraiman's work with metal includes Tango, Innocence, Balloon Girl series, Blossom Ball City of Bat Yam, Solar system Kiryat Bialik and Teva Square, Neot Hovav, Israel and his work with stone includes Gezer Calendar, Kansas,  The Fallen Soldiers Elkana, Mushrooms and Gnomes, and Restoration of Ancient Coins.

Works 
2021 - Innocence Monument, Bat Yam, Israel
2020 - Perspective Public Monumnet, Bat Yam, Israel 
2019 - Blossom Ball, Public Monumnent, Bat Yam, Israel 
2018 - Solar System Public Monumnet, Kiryat Motzkin city hall, Israel
2015 - Solar System monument, Ramat Hovav, Israel 
2015 - The Band, Givaat Shmuel, Israel 
2014 - The Church of God Monument, Horns of Hattin, Israel 
2009 - Son’s Inheritance monument, Elkana, Israel 
2009 - Gezer ancient tablet reproduction, Leawood, Kansas, USA 
2008 - TEVA Fountain, Beer Sheba, Israel 
2006 - Dwarf Park Holon, Israel
2004 - Animals, The Biblical Zoo, Jerusalem, Israel
2001 - Creation, Beilinson Hospital, Israel 
1999 - A Tribute to Yitzhak Rabin, Beilinson Hospital, Israel 
1998 - Rotem Lookout, Jerusalem, Israel 
1997 - The Stork’s Visit, Shoham, Israel 
1995 - Sculptors working in the street, Shoham, Israel 
1992 - Hat Lady Ramat Hasharon, Israel 
1991 - Lovers, Ganei Tikva concert hall, Israel 
1990 - No Title Rishon Lezion, Israel

Exhibitions
2018 - Solo Exhibition, Discount Bank, Tel Aviv, Israel
2016 - ‘Gadi Fraiman’ Gallery launce, Mishmar David, Israel 
2014 - Bartoux Gallery, Cannes, France 
2004 - Harvey Krueger's Sculpture Garden Dedication, New Jersey, USA 
1993 - Solo exhibition, Migdal gallery, Tel Aviv, Israel
1992 - Sculpture Garden Dedication, Brogues, Belgium

References 

Israeli artists
Living people
1958 births

he:גדי פריימן